Natalina Sanguinetti (born 25 December 1940) is a retired Italian fencer. She competed in the team foil event at the 1964 Summer Olympics and finished in fourth place.

References

1940 births
Living people
Italian female fencers
Olympic fencers of Italy
Fencers at the 1964 Summer Olympics
Sportspeople from Genoa